Akira Ioane (born 16 June 1995) is a New Zealand rugby union player. Ioane plays blindside flanker and number 8 for the Auckland rugby union team in the Mitre 10 Cup, for the Blues in the Super Rugby competition and was selected for the All Blacks in 2017, having previously represented New Zealand internationally in Sevens and the Māori All Blacks.

Early life and family
Born in Auckland on 16 June 1995, Ioane is the older brother of current All Blacks squad member Rieko Ioane. They moved to Japan shortly after Akira's birth, for four years, while Eddie played rugby for Ricoh. Of Māori and Samoan descent, Ioane affiliates to the Te Whānau-ā-Apanui and Ngāpuhi iwi. He was educated at Auckland Grammar School.

Rugby career

International Rugby
Ioane joined the New Zealand sevens team in 2014 and made his debut at the 2014 Wellington Sevens. He was a member of the All Blacks Sevens squad at the 2014 Commonwealth Games in Glasgow. Ioane played for the New Zealand Sevens Squad in the 2015 Wellington Sevens. He was awarded as Player of the Finals in New Zealand vs South Africa. Ioane also played for the New Zealand Sevens Squad for Sydney Sevens in 2016 in February. In the finals he was awarded as Player of the Finals whilst his Brother Reiko Ioane got the Player of Tournament against Australia in the Sevens Tournament.

On 17 June 2017, Ioane started for the Māori All Blacks against the touring British and Irish Lions during a 10–32 loss at the Rotorua International Stadium. Ioane played the full 80 minutes against the Lions.

While on tour with the Māori All Blacks in 2017, Ioane was called up for the All Blacks as injury cover for Blues team-mate Jerome Kaino. Ioane made his international debut for New Zealand on 14 November 2017, replacing the in-form Highlanders flanker Liam Squire off the bench in the 53rd minute of a 28–23 victory over a French XV.

Following the shortened Super Rugby season and Super Rugby Aotearoa, as well as his showing in the 2020 North vs South match, Ioane was selected in Ian Foster's first All Blacks squad, for the 2020 Rugby Championship.

Super Rugby
He earned a Blues contract for 2015 after a stunning performance at the 2014 Wellington Sevens. He replaced Peter Saili who left for a contract in France.
On the 2/5/15 whilst playing the Western Force he made 12 carries for 118 meters including a try from 55m out.

On 7 June 2017, with injury to Jerome Kaino, Ioane started in the Blues' historic 22–16 victory over the British and Irish Lions. Ioane performed very well but was overshadowed by the departing number 8 Steven Luatua.

Ioane has been a regular starter for the Blues since 2017 and is one of the leading try-scorers of the 2018 season. Ioane has scored six tries in the 2018 Super Rugby season and has scored the most tries of any forward.

Ioane was dropped from the Blues opening matches of the Super rugby 2020 season.

References

External links
 All Blacks Profile
 
 
 
 
 

1995 births
New Zealand rugby union players
New Zealand Māori rugby union players
New Zealand sportspeople of Samoan descent
Blues (Super Rugby) players
Auckland rugby union players
New Zealand international rugby sevens players
Rugby union flankers
People educated at Auckland Grammar School
Rugby union players from Auckland
Māori All Blacks players
Rugby sevens players at the 2016 Summer Olympics
Olympic rugby sevens players of New Zealand
Commonwealth Games rugby sevens players of New Zealand
Rugby sevens players at the 2014 Commonwealth Games
New Zealand male rugby sevens players
Ngāpuhi people
Te Whānau-ā-Apanui people
Commonwealth Games medallists in rugby sevens
Commonwealth Games silver medallists for New Zealand
Living people
New Zealand international rugby union players
Medallists at the 2014 Commonwealth Games
New Zealand expatriates in Japan